Liu Bing or Bing Liu may refer to:

Emperor Chong of Han (143–145), personal name Liu Bing, infant emperor of the Han dynasty
Liu Bing (official) (433–477), official of the Liu Song dynasty
Bing Liu (computer scientist) (born 1963), Chinese-American computer scientist
Bing Liu (filmmaker) (born 1989), Chinese-American documentary filmmaker
Bing Liu (scientist) (1982/1983–2020), Chinese-American coronavirus researcher, murdered over an intimate partner

See also
Liu Bin (disambiguation)
Liu Ping (disambiguation)